Peter James Richerson (born October 11, 1943) is an American biologist. He is Distinguished Professor Emeritus of the Department of Environmental Science and Policy at the University of California, Davis.

Life
Richerson studied entomology at UC Davis, earning his B.S. in 1965. In 1969, he completed his Ph.D. in zoology. After a postdoc and junior professorship, he was from 1977 until 2006 Professor of Environmental Science at UC Davis. He was a guest professor at University of California, Berkeley (1977–78), Duke University (1984), and the University of Exeter (2004). In 1991 he was a guest researcher at the Bielefeld University.

Work
Richerson's research interests include sociocultural evolution, human ecology and applied and tropical limnology.

Books (selected)

References

External links 
 Faculty profile at UC Davis
  on the origin of language, April 15, 2011, Brooklyn College

University of California, Davis faculty
21st-century American biologists
1943 births
Living people
Cognitive science of religion
University of California, Davis alumni